Nicolas Baudoux known by his stage name DJ Elephant Power, is a Belgian turntablist and producer. With the Cologne label Sonig (from Mouse On Mars), he has released various albums.

In 2013, he started his own label: Elephant Power Records

History
After his début with his brother Laurent in the duo called: Scratch Pet Land, he received a critical success through his second solo release "Scratch The Hulu" where he combined absurdity humour, hip hop samples and tons of impressive sounds.
In the end of 2004, he embarked on an extensive tour, during which he opened for a number of musicians, including Mouse On Mars and Ratatat.

In 2011, he won the prestigious Belgian prize "Octave de la musique" in category electro.

Biography
DJ Elephant Power grew up with both hip hop and electronic music. With a vast experience in music composition, turntablism and mixing, he has become a key figure in the Brussels’s underground scene. His DJ sets are so energetic that he has earned much admiration. 
In the club, he brings elaborate set, going from hypnotic minimal to straightforward and banging techno. Then again, the DJ has always been about more than just techno. He likes to dip into other genres and morph them together in innovative ways.

Discography

Studio albums
 "No Si, Ni So" (2004)
 "Scratch The Hulu" (2007)
 "Atlas Anthem" (2008)
 "Elepha In Da Flash (2010)"
 "Night" (2019)

EPs 
 "Gold Skratch" (2013)
 "Skratchstep Fire" (2014)
 "Sylver Skratch" (2014)
 "Future Thunder" (2015)
 "Rebel Snare / Hyper Kick" (2016)
 "Rising Cloud / Tropic Clap" (2016)
 "Soda Waves ep" (2017)

Singles
 "Enter (Paradise) single" (2020)
 "Slowdown single" (2021)
 "Oasis" (2021)

Guest appearances
 "Tromatic Reflexxions" by Von Südenfed (2007)
 "Bronze by Gold " Choreographer Stephanie Thiersch (2015)
 "Chombotrope" Choreographer Stephanie Thiersch (2017)

Soundtrack
 "Fini de Rire" director Olivier Malvoisin (2015)
 "Hello to Emptiness" Choreographer Stéphanie Thiersch (2022)
 "Land Im Land" Choreographer Stéphanie Thiersch (2023)

Award
 Belgian "Octaves" awards 2011 (category Electro)
 Cologne Dance award 2017 with the Chombotrope project

Interviews
 For the Goethe-Institut, conducted by Mario Vondegracht
 For the Word Magazine
 For the Larsen Magazine
 For the Como Las Grecas

References

External links
 Official website
 Elephant Power Records
 Sonig

Belgian DJs
Living people
Year of birth missing (living people)